The Nazareth Historic District is a national historic district located in the center of the Borough of Nazareth, Northampton County, Pennsylvania, which is located ten miles northeast of Bethlehem and seven miles northwest of Easton.

It was added to the National Register of Historic Places in 1988.

History
Mostly residential in nature, with commercial buildings located in its central section, the Nazareth Historic District was laid out in a grid pattern between the mid-eighteenth and early twentieth centuries, and includes 503 contributing buildings and 1 contributing site (Moravian Congregational Cemetery). The buildings are primarily 2 1/2 stories tall and constructed of brick or frame. Most of the remaining stone buildings were built prior to 1858 when Nazareth came under civil control from the Moravian church.

Notable non-residential buildings include the Nazareth Moravian Church (1861, St. John's U.C.C. Church (1905-1907), and St. John's Lutheran Church (1858). Located in the district is the separately listed Nazareth Hall Tract.

It was added to the National Register of Historic Places in 1988.

Gallery

References

Historic districts in Northampton County, Pennsylvania
Historic districts on the National Register of Historic Places in Pennsylvania
National Register of Historic Places in Northampton County, Pennsylvania